William Harold Hicks (12 November 1888 – 14 May 1974) was a Progressive Conservative party member of the House of Commons of Canada. He was born in Lauder, Manitoba and became an agrologist by career.

He was first elected at the Fraser Valley riding in the 1958 general election, but defeated in the 1962 and 1963 general elections. He served only one term, the 24th Parliament.

References

External links
 

1888 births
1974 deaths
Members of the House of Commons of Canada from British Columbia
Progressive Conservative Party of Canada MPs